The 2021 Henry Ford Health System 200 was the 14th stock car race of the 2021 ARCA Menards Series season and 33rd iteration of the event. The race was held on Friday, August 20, 2021, in Brooklyn, Michigan at Michigan International Speedway, a two-mile (3.2 km) moderate-banked D-shaped speedway. The race took the scheduled 100 laps to complete. At race's end, Ty Gibbs of Joe Gibbs Racing would dominate the race and win his 16th career ARCA Menards Series win and his eighth of the season. To fill out the podium, Corey Heim of Venturini Motorsports and Nick Sanchez of Rev Racing would finish second and third, respectively.

Background 

The race was held at Michigan International Speedway, a two-mile (3.2 km) moderate-banked D-shaped speedway located in Brooklyn, Michigan. The track is used primarily for NASCAR events. It is known as a "sister track" to Texas World Speedway as MIS's oval design was a direct basis of TWS, with moderate modifications to the banking in the corners, and was used as the basis of Auto Club Speedway. The track is owned by International Speedway Corporation. Michigan International Speedway is recognized as one of motorsports' premier facilities because of its wide racing surface and high banking (by open-wheel standards; the 18-degree banking is modest by stock car standards).

Entry list

Starting lineup 
No qualifying was scheduled for the event. The starting lineup was instead determined by car owner points for the 2021 season and provisionals. As a result, Ty Gibbs of Joe Gibbs Racing won the pole.

Race results

References 

2021 ARCA Menards Series
NASCAR races at Michigan International Speedway
Henry Ford Health System 200
Henry Ford Health System 200